Nanomedicine: Nanotechnology, Biology and Medicine is a peer-reviewed medical journal published bimonthly by Elsevier. It covers research on nanoscience and nanotechnology applied to the life sciences and medicine. This includes basic, translational, and clinical research.  Publishing formats include original articles, communications, reviews, perspectives, notes, and letters to the editor. The Editor in Chief is Professor Tatiana K. Bronich, PhD

Abstracting and indexing
This journal is abstracted and indexed by:
 Biological Abstracts
 BIOSIS Previews
 Biotechnology Citation Index
 EMBASE
 MEDLINE
 Science Citation Index Expanded 
 Scopus

See also 
 ACS Nano
 Journal of Biomedical Nanotechnology
 Nanotoxicology

References

External links 
 

Nanomedicine journals
Publications established in 2005
Elsevier academic journals
Bimonthly journals
English-language journals